A Residency was an administrative division of:

the former British Empire. Most notable were the following:
British Residency of the Persian Gulf
Residencies of British India see: :Category:Residencies of British India
the Dutch East Indies, e.g.
Jambi Residency, Batavia Residency, Semarang Residency, etc. See Administrative divisions of the Dutch East Indies.

See also
Presidency (administrative division)

References

Types of administrative division